Inga densiflora is a species of Fabaceae described by botanist George Bentham. The native range extends from South-East Mexico to Bolivia. It is the most common species of Inga utilized for its fruits in the highlands of Colombia. The common name is Guamo Salado in Central America and Pacay del Monte (mountain ice-cream-bean) in Bolivia.

References

 

densiflora